Clare H. Torry (born 29 November 1947) is a British singer, well-known for improvising and performing the wordless vocals on the song "The Great Gig in the Sky" on Pink Floyd's 1973 album The Dark Side of the Moon. She sang the theme of the 1977 film 'OCE' in the same style, and also covered the Dolly Parton single "Love Is Like a Butterfly" for the opening titles of the BBC TV series Butterflies, which ran for four series between 1978 and 1983.

Early life
Clare Torry was born in November 1947 in Marylebone, London, to Geoffrey Napier Torry (1916-1979), who combined careers as Lieutenant-Commander in the Fleet Air Arm and as a Flight Lieutenant in the RAF, and his wife Dorothy W. Singer (1916-2017), who was the secretary to six BBC Directors-General.

Career
By the end of the 1960s Torry had started a career as a performer, mainly singing covers of popular songs. In 1973 Pink Floyd were recording The Dark Side of the Moon at Abbey Road Studios, and engineer Alan Parsons booked Torry to sing on an instrumental by Richard Wright to be called "The Great Gig in the Sky". 

On 4 November 1973, Torry sang "The Great Gig in the Sky" at the Rainbow Theatre in London. She sang it with Pink Floyd again at their 1990 concert at Knebworth, and with Roger Waters at some of his 1980s solo shows. She also contributed to Waters' 1986 soundtrack When the Wind Blows and to his 1987 album Radio K.A.O.S..

Torry performed as a session singer (on 1970s UK TV adverts) and as a live backing vocalist with Kevin Ayers, Olivia Newton-John, Shriekback, The Alan Parsons Project (for whom she also sang lead vocal on one track on 1979's Eve), Procol Harum mainman Gary Brooker, Matthew Fisher, Cerrone, Meat Loaf (a duet on the song "Nowhere Fast", and the hit "Modern Girl"), Johnny Mercer and Doctors of Madness. 

She performed Dolly Parton's "Love Is Like a Butterfly" as the theme music to the 1970s Wendy Craig/Geoffrey Palmer, Carla Laine sitcom Butterflies. The song was released as a single in 1981.  Torry also released "Love for Living" in 1969, which was produced by Ronnie Scott and Robin Gibb. She sang the theme of the 1977 film 'OCE' in the same style as "The Great Gig in the Sky".

Torry sang backing vocals on the track "The War Song" from Culture Club's Waking Up with the House on Fire album in 1984, as well as on the track "Yellowstone Park" on the Tangerine Dream album Le Parc the following year. Her voice can also be heard singing "Love to Love You Baby" (originally by Donna Summer) during the opening scene of the cult BBC Play for Today production of Abigail's Party in 1977.

Torry is also credited on the 1987 album En Dejlig Torsdag (A Lovely Thursday) by the Danish pop rock band TV-2, where she sings in a fashion similar to "The Great Gig in the Sky" at the end of the tracks "Stjernen I Mit Liv" ("The Star in my Life") and "I Baronessens Seng" ("In the Bed of the Baroness").

On 20 October 2010, Torry was presented with a BASCA Gold Badge Award in recognition of her unique contribution to music.

Lawsuit
In 2004, Torry sued Pink Floyd and EMI for songwriting royalties on the basis that her contribution to "The Great Gig in the Sky" constituted co-authorship with keyboardist Richard Wright. Originally, she was paid the standard flat fee of £30 for Sunday studio work (the equivalent of £400 in 2022). In 2005, an out-of-court settlement was reached in Torry's favour, although the terms of the settlement were not disclosed. All releases after 2005 carry an additional credit for "Vocal composition by Clare Torry" for the "Great Gig in the Sky" segment of the booklet or liner notes.

Later work 

In February 2006, Torry released Heaven in the Sky, a collection of her early pop recordings from the 1960s and 1970s. In 2011, she released a collaboration with musician and composer John Fyffe.

References 

1947 births
Living people
People from Battle, East Sussex
English women singers
People educated at Battle Abbey School
British session musicians